Carl Benjamin Pentney (born 29 October 1989) is an English former professional footballer who played as a goalkeeper. He is currently the head of academy goalkeeping at Ipswich Town.

Club career

Leicester City
Born in Colchester, Essex, Pentney started his career with the Leicester City youth system, where he was a regular for the under-18 side as well as the England under-17 team. He was part of the under-18 squad that won the FA Premier Academy League by beating Sunderland under-18s 4–3 in a penalty shootout in the 2006–07 season.

Pentney signed his first professional contract on 5 May 2007, signing a one-year deal alongside Andy King, Max Gradel and Eric Odhiambo. He joined Conference Premier team York City on a one-month loan on 9 August following a trial, but he failed to make any appearances before returning to Leicester on 8 September. He moved to Ilkeston Town on a one-month loan on 29 January 2008, but was recalled on 8 February. He later had a loan at Fisher Athletic, where he made two appearances. He signed a new one-year contract with Leicester in June 2008.

Pentney joined Woking on a one-month loan on 23 October and he finished this spell with two appearances. He made his first team debut for Leicester after coming on as a 59th minute substitute for David Martin against Swindon Town in a League One match, where he made saves against Simon Cox and Hal Robson-Kanu as Leicester drew 1–1.

On 30 June 2009, Pentney signed a six-month contract extension with Leicester. On 1 December Pentney again signed a six-month contract extension with Leicester, keeping him at the club until the end of the 2009–10 season. On 13 February 2010, Pentney joined Leamington on a one-month loan deal which was later extended to the end of the season. He finished the 2009–10 season having made no appearances for Leicester and the club announced on 17 May that he would be released when his contract expired on 30 June.

Colchester United
Pentney joined League One side Colchester United on a non-contract basis on 5 August to cover for injured goalkeeper Ben Williams, before eventually signing a one-year contract on 9 September.

On 4 November Pentney joined Bath City of the Conference Premier on a one-month loan as cover for the injured Ryan Robinson. He made his debut two days later in a 2–2 with Altrincham. The loan was extended for a second month in December. Pentney signed for Conference South club Chelmsford City on loan until the end of the 2010–11 season on 10 March 2011. On 12 September, Pentney returned to Chelmsford on a one-month loan deal. He signed for Conference Premier side Hayes & Yeading United on a one-month loan on 16 November. Pentney signed a one-year contract extension with Colchester on 12 June 2012. He joined Histon on a month-long loan deal on 9 November 2012.

Bishop's Stortford
Pentney joined Bishop's Stortford on loan in January 2013. His contract with Colchester United was cancelled by mutual consent in the last week of the same month, and subsequently he joined Bishop's Stortford until the end of the season.

Chelmsford City
Pentney signed for Chelmsford City on 12 June 2013.

Maidenhead United
After a brief spell with Braintree Town, in which he made two appearances, Pentney joined Maidenhead United in 2015, and was ever-present over the next three seasons, including promotion to the National League in 2017. After 148 consecutive league games in which he played the full 90 minutes, his streak ended when he was sent off at Havant & Waterlooville in October 2018 and was suspended for the following game. Pentney left the Magpies at the end of the 2018–19 season.

Chelmsford City return
On 21 May 2019, Pentney rejoined Chelmsford City for a fourth spell. On 9 November 2019, following a 2–2 draw at home to Dorking Wanderers, Chelmsford announced Pentney's retirement after taking up a full-time role at Ipswich Town.

Coaching career
In November 2019, Pentney announced his retirement from playing football in order to take up a full-time position as head of academy goalkeeping at Ipswich Town.

Pentney played for Brightlingsea Town in the Essex and Suffolk Border Football League in 2020–21. In the 2021–22 season, he was registered as a player at Brightlingsea Regent.

Career statistics

References

External links

1989 births
Living people
Sportspeople from Colchester
English footballers
Association football goalkeepers
Leicester City F.C. players
York City F.C. players
Ilkeston Town F.C. (1945) players
Fisher Athletic F.C. players
Woking F.C. players
Leamington F.C. players
Colchester United F.C. players
Bath City F.C. players
Chelmsford City F.C. players
Hayes & Yeading United F.C. players
Histon F.C. players
Bishop's Stortford F.C. players
Braintree Town F.C. players
Maidenhead United F.C. players
Brightlingsea Regent F.C. players
Ipswich Town F.C. non-playing staff
English Football League players
National League (English football) players
England youth international footballers